Hwaseong Heroes Baseball Park is a ballpark in Hwaseong, South Korea. The stadium is used by the Hwaseong Heroes of the KBO Futures League.

References

Baseball venues in South Korea
Sport in Gyeonggi Province
Kiwoom Heroes
Sports venues completed in 2014
2014 establishments in South Korea